Semilasso is a cultural centre in the Královo Pole district of Brno, Czech Republic, which takes its name from the former public house U semilassa, once known as the Schaffgotschův hostinec, which was renamed about 1836 in tribute to Prince Hermann von Pückler-Muskau (1785–1871). Semilasso is the nom-de-plume adopted by this a famous German traveller and landscape gardener for his autobiographical travel books.

Buildings and structures in Brno